A Lincoln Dinner is an annual celebration and fundraising event of many state and county organizations of the Republican Party in the United States. It is held annually in February or March depending on the county and often features a well known speaker from the Republican Party.  Its counterpart for the Democratic Party, held the same time every year, is the Jefferson-Jackson Dinner.

The event is traditionally named after Abraham Lincoln as the first elected president of the Republican Party who helped found and shape the party.  However, the event has since been renamed in many locations.  Most typically, Ronald Reagan has been honored in addition or instead, resulting in events named Reagan Dinner, Reagan Day Dinner, Lincoln–Reagan Dinner, and so on.  In particular, this trend is common in the Southern United States, where the Republican Party essentially absorbed what had previously been the Democratic Party's constituency in a process which began in the 1940s and then lasted through the 1990s (most of this process occurred during the 1960s, when White Southerners who had previously been Democrats began to abandon the party, especially in national elections, because of misgivings about the Democratic Party's increased support for African-American civil rights), resulting in the present situation that most of those White Southerners suspicious or disapproving of President Lincoln and sympathetic to the Confederacy have switched from being Democrats to Republicans.  Commenting on this difference in 2005, Senator Lindsey Graham of South Carolina joked, "We don't do Lincoln Day Dinners in South Carolina.  It's nothing personal, but it takes a while to get over things," referencing the fact that Lincoln's election led to the secession of South Carolina and other states, which caused the American Civil War.

See also 
 Jefferson–Jackson Dinner
 History of the Republican Party (United States)

References

External links
Lincoln is Yielding to Reagan: Some counties change name of annual GOP event in the Houston Chronicle

 

Republican Party (United States) events